Naeem Akhtar may refer to:

 Naeem Akhtar (cricketer) (born 1967), former Pakistani cricketer
 Naeem Akhtar (field hockey) (born 1961), Pakistani field hockey player
 Naeem Akhtar (politician), Indian politician and a cabinet minister in Jammu and Kashmir government